Ochirbatyn Burmaa (born 28 May 1982) is a Mongolian freestyle wrestler. She competed in the freestyle 72 kg event at the 2012 Summer Olympics; she defeated Leah Callahan in the 1/8 finals and was eliminated by Maider Unda in the quarterfinals.  She also competed in this weight category at the 2004 Summer Olympics, where she finished in 10th place.

She represented Mongolia at the 2020 Summer Olympics held in Tokyo, Japan. She competed in the women's freestyle 76 kg event.

References

External links
 
 
 

1982 births
Living people
Mongolian female sport wrestlers
Olympic wrestlers of Mongolia
Wrestlers at the 2004 Summer Olympics
Wrestlers at the 2012 Summer Olympics
Wrestlers at the 2020 Summer Olympics
Asian Games medalists in wrestling
Medalists at the 2006 Asian Games
Medalists at the 2014 Asian Games
Asian Games bronze medalists for Mongolia
Wrestlers at the 2006 Asian Games
Sportspeople from Ulaanbaatar
Wrestlers at the 2014 Asian Games
World Wrestling Championships medalists
Asian Wrestling Championships medalists
21st-century Mongolian women